North District is a district in north Hsinchu City, Taiwan. North District is the city seat of Hsinchu City. It is the smallest of the three districts in Hsinchu City.

Geography
 Area: 
 Population: 152,332 (February 2023)

Administrative divisions
The district consists of Ximen, Rende, Qianyuan, Zhongyang, Chongli, Shifang, Xingnan, Beimen, Zhongxing, Datong, Zhongshan, Zhanghe, Xinmin, Minfu, Shuitian, Wenya, Guangtian, Shilin, Fulin, Guxian, Nanya, Jiushe, Wuling, Nanliao, Jiugang, Kangle, Gangbei, Zhongliao, Haibin, Keya, Yuying, Quxi, Xiya, Nanshi, Dapeng, Jingfu, Panshi, Xinya, Guanghua, Jinhua, Jinzhu, Nanzhong, Jinya, Taixi and Zhongya Village.

Government institutions
 Hsinchu Air Base
 Hsinchu City Government
 Hsinchu City Council

Infrastructures
 Hsinchu City EPB Incinerator Plant

Tourist attractions
 Hsinchu City Fire Museum
 Hsinchu Chenghuang Temple
 Hsinchu CKS Baseball Stadium
 Hsinchu Fish Harbor
 Hsinchu Museum of Military Dependents Village
 Hsinchu Performing Arts Center
 Immaculate Heart of Mary Cathedral
 St. John Church

References

External links

 

Districts of Hsinchu